Malov is a Slavic male surname, its feminine counterpart is Malova. It may refer to
 Arkady Malov, Chuvash poet and translator.
 Oleg Malov, Russian pianist, professor at the Saint Petersburg Conservatory.
 Roman Malov (born 1977), Russian ice hockey player
 Sergey Malov (musician) (born 1983), Russian violinist and violist.
 Sergey Malov (1880–1957), Russian turkologist
 Stoyko Malov (born 1943), Bulgarian Olympic wrestler
 Anna Malova (born c. 1972), Russian beauty queen and physician
 Anna Malova (volleyball) (born 1990), Russian volleyball player